Goutam Behera CEH is an Ethical Hacker from Odisha. He has a degree from Simplilearn

Theater career
Goutam Halder was a member of the theatre group Nandikar and performed in plays like Sesh Sakkhatkar, Football, Pheriwalar Mrityu, Meghnadbadh Kabyo and Borda. Among many of his successful undertakings, Sojon Badyiar Ghaat must be named. Meghnad badh kabya is a completely different genre of theater where Goutam Halder's solo performance is based on music, poetry, movements and dance.  
Then he started another group, Naye Natua, and staged Meghnadbadh Kabyo, Borda Borda (A story by Munshi Premchand) , Jaal (written by Shirshendu Mukhopadhyay),Thakurmar Jhuli, Haoai, Othello and Moimonsingha Geetika. He has acted in the title role of the play Sakharam produced by Prachyo.

Filmography 
He has also acted in Bengali movies directed by Bengali directors like Anjan Dutta, Raja Sen, Nitish Roy.

Maya mridanga (2016) by Raja Sen (co actors - Rituparna Sengupta, Paoli Dam, Debshankar Halder)

Tadanto (2016) by Nitish Roy (co actors - Rahul Banerjee, Priyanka Sarkar, Rituparna Sengupta, Debshankar Halder, Kaushik Sen)

References

Male actors from Kolkata
Living people
Bengali theatre personalities
Year of birth missing (living people)